is Hitomi Takahashi's debut single under Sony Records' (gr8! records) label. The single was released on April 13, 2005, in one format. This is the first retail single for her first album "sympathy."

Overview
"Bokutachi no Yukue" is Hitomi Takahashi's debut single and so far, her most successful single in terms of sales and its Oricon Weekly position. The single became an instant hit, and debuted at #1 for its first week on the Oricon Charts. This made her the second female to have had a debut single reach #1 and the third solo artist to have a debut single reach #1 (in Japan). The single ended up selling well over 100,000 copies. The A-side song "Bokutachi no Yukue" is the 3rd opening theme song for the anime series Gundam SEED Destiny.

When the song was unveiled on the Gundam SEED Destiny official website, the website received so many hits that it had to temporarily shutdown for lack of bandwidth.

The song is a darker pop/rock tune with "violin" type sounds to add gloominess to the song. A guitar is played throughout most of the song, stopping every once in a while for no more than 20 seconds, there is also a long guitar solo after the second chorus is sung. The Kirin part of her song "Kaze no Kirin" is a mystical Chinese creature whose appearance signifies a good omen.

Sample of the translated lyrics:

Music video
The music video used for "Bokutachi no Yukue" was shot by director Seki Ryuuji. The video has Hitomi singing in a seemingly deserted wasteland. Hitomi is also shown running throughout the video, until she stops in front of a cloaked man. After receiving a white rose from him, everything starts to become blurred as a fierce wind forms from the rose. Once the wind dissipates, she proceeds to follow the man and then the video ends.

Track listing
 "" - 4:31   Lyrics by Yuta Nakano & shungo.  Music and arrangement by Yuta Nakano 
 " (Giraffe of Wind)" - 6:41   Lyrics by Hitomi Takahashi & Natsumi Watanabe  Music by Tsutomu Yamasaki  Arrangement by Shinya Saito 
 "" - 3:50   Lyrics by Hitomi Takahashi & mavie  Music by BOUNCEBACK  Arrangement by Gen Kushizaki 
 "僕たちの行方 -Instrumental- " - 4:31

Personnel
Hitomi Takahashi - vocals

Production
Producers - Kazuma Jo
Director - Kazuma Jo, Taku Sugawara
Mixing - Eiichi Nishizawa (Studio Rine)
Hair & Make-up - Mihoko Fujiwara
Styling - Itoko Shiino
Photography - Makoto Okuguchi
Design - Sachie Shibata

Performances
 ?, 2005 - MBS ANIME FES.'05
April 15, 2005 - PopJam
April 18, 2005 - C-Toryumon
April 22, 2005 - Music Station
April 23, 2005 - CDTV
May 6, 2005 - Music Fighter
August 28, 2005 - Bokura no Ongaku♪LIVE
October 29, 2005 - MUSIC FAIR 21
March 9, 2006 - Gold Disc Award 2006
May 7, 2006 - Sony Music Anime Fes.06
June 11, 2006 - Sony Music Anime Fes.06 at Osaka

Charts
Oricon Sales Chart (Japan)

RIAJ Certification
"Bokutachi no Yukue" has been certified gold for shipments of over 100,000 by the Recording Industry Association of Japan.

References 

2005 debut singles
Anime songs
Hitomi Takahashi (singer) songs
Oricon Weekly number-one singles
Songs written by Hitomi Takahashi (singer)
Gr8! Records singles